
Shirreff or Shirreffs may refer to:

People

Shirreff
 Alan Shirreff (1919–2006), English cricketer
 Charles Shirreff (painter) (–), deaf-mute Scottish miniaturist
 Charles Shirreff (businessman) (1768–1847), Canadian businessman and public official
 Emily Shirreff (1814–1897), British educationist and activist for women's education
 Richard Shirreff (born 1955), British Army officer, general in the Iraq War (2003–2011)
 William Shirreff, British Royal Navy officer

Shirreffs
 Gordon D. Shirreffs (1914–1996), American writer of western and juvenile novels
 John Shirreffs (born 1945), American racehorse trainer
 Steve Shirreffs (born 1976), American ice hockey player

Places
 Cape Shirreff, South Shetland Islands, Antarctica
 Shirreff Base, South Shetland Islands, Antarctica
 Shirreff Cove, South Shetland Islands, Antarctica
 Shirreff Hall, Dalhousie University residence hall, Halifax, Nova Scotia, Canada